Emil Dima (born 22 February 1997) is a Romanian racing cyclist, who currently rides for UCI Continental team .

Major results

2014
 National Junior Road Championships
2nd Time trial
2nd Road race
 7th Memorial Dimitar Yankov
2015
 National Junior Road Championships
1st  Time trial
1st  Road race
2016
 1st  Time trial, National Under-23 Road Championships
2017
 National Under-23 Road Championships
1st  Road race
2nd Time trial
 3rd Road race, National Road Championships
2018
 National Under-23 Road Championships
1st  Time trial
1st  Road race
 6th Overall Tour of Romania
 8th Overall Tour of Bihor 
2019
 1st  Time trial, National Under-23 Road Championships
 9th Overall Tour of Szeklerland
 8th Overall Tour of Romania
2020
 National Road Championships
2nd Time trial
4th Road race
 4th Overall Tour of Szeklerland
 7th Overall Tour of Romania
2021 
 8th Overall Tour of Romania
1st Stage 4 
2022
 National Road Championships
1st  Road race

References

External links

1997 births
Living people
Romanian male cyclists
People from Brașov County